Sokai may refer to:

annual meeting (総会, sōkai) Economy of Japan
Sokai, Zen ranks and hierarchy
Sokai, Tibet, village in Tibet